Abdur Rasheed Biswas (died 1991) was a Bangladeshi politician. He was elected as MP of Jessore-10 in the first general election of Bangladesh.

He lived in Khalia village of what is now Mohammadpur Upazila of Magura District. He died on 11 December 1991.

References

Awami League politicians
People from Magura District
1st Jatiya Sangsad members
1991 deaths